Joseph Tortolano (born 6 April 1966) is a Scottish retired professional footballer who played in England, Scotland, and Iceland, making over 300 league appearances.

Career

Club career
Born in Stirling, Tortolano played for West Bromwich Albion, Hibernian, Falkirk, Clyde, KR, Stirling Albion and East Stirlingshire.

The bulk of Tortolano's career was spent at Hibernian, where he became somewhat of a cult figure during his eleven-year spell. The player admitted that the harsh criticism he received from supporters over the course of several years of poor performances eventually inspired him to improve his fitness in the early 1990s.

While playing for Hibs in Gordon Rae's testimonial match against Manchester United in October 1988, Tortolano was sent off for a mistimed tackle on Gordon Strachan.

Tortolano retired as a player in 2001, and joined the Cowdenbeath coaching staff.

International career
Tortolano represented the Scotland national under-21 football team, but never played for the Scottish senior team.

References

External links

Scotland U21 stats at Fitbastats

1966 births
Clyde F.C. players
East Stirlingshire F.C. players
Expatriate footballers in Iceland
Falkirk F.C. players
Association football fullbacks
Association football midfielders
Hibernian F.C. players
Living people
Footballers from Stirling
Scotland under-21 international footballers
Scottish expatriate footballers
Scottish Football League players
Scottish expatriate sportspeople in Iceland
Scottish footballers
Stirling Albion F.C. players
West Bromwich Albion F.C. players